Maccabi Haifa is one of the biggest sports clubs in Israel and a part of the Maccabi association. It runs several sports clubs and teams in Haifa which have competed in a variety of sports over the years, such as Football, Basketball, Weightlifting, swimming, Tennis, Table tennis, Volleyball, Team handball, Water polo, Ice hockey, Artistic gymnastics, Chess, Boxing, Fencing, Rugby and others. Maccabi Haifa is well known for its green and white stripes uniforms.

Teams
Maccabi Haifa B.C. - basketball
Maccabi Haifa F.C. - football
Maccabi Haifa F.C. (women) - football
Maccabi Haifa W. - weightlifting
Haifa Wild Boars - rugby

Notable members
Meiron Cheruti (born 1997), swimmer
Jonatan Kopelev (born 1991), swimmer
Eithan Urbach (born 1977), Olympic backstroke swimmer
 Tom Yaacobov (born 1992), triple jumper

References

External links

 
Sport in Haifa
Multi-sport clubs in Israel
1912 establishments in the Ottoman Empire